The Northern Epirus Liberation Front (Métopo Apelefthérosis Voreíou Ipeírou (MAVI)) also called the Northern Epirote Liberation Organization (Εθνική Απελευθερωτική Οργάνωση Βορειοηπειρωτών (ΕΑΟΒΗ), Ethnikí Apeleftherotikí Orgánosi Voreioipeirotón (EAOVI)), was an ethnic Greek resistance group that operated in areas of southern Albania during the Italian and German occupation of Albania (1942–1944). The group operated after the withdrawal of the Greek forces from the area (April 1941), against the invading Italians, Germans and both against the Albanian communist and collaborationist organizations.

History
In May 1942, the first Northern Epirote resistance groups appeared in the area of Delvinë led by two locals and former officers of the Greek army: Spyridon Lytos and Ioannis Videlis. Soon several resistance groups were formed by the local Greek population all over southern Albania. They were operating in the regions: Pogon, Lunxhëri, Zagorie, Riza, Himara, Vlorë, Përmet, Leskovik and Korçë. In June 1942 these groups were organized under one leadership and the MAVI (also called EAOVI) was formed. The leading spirit was Vasileios Sachinis, a native from Douvian (Dropull).

The organization was a branch of the right-wing EDES that operated in Greece and its headquarters moved from place to place in southern Albania.

Italian occupation
Widespread action was taken by the Northern Epirote resistance in December 1942, when attacks on Italian controlled frontier posts and gendarmerie stations increased. In the regions of Zagorie, Pogon, Delvinë, Sarandë (Vourkos) and  Rhize sectors guerilla activity by MAVI was increasing. That period the leaders of the organization received a British mission in the village of Polican.

As a result of that activity Italian occupation forces took action, operating with units of the Albanian fascist militia. In March 1943, 160 inhabitants of Korce were sent to concentration camps for suspected underground activities with the Northern Epirote resistance. Moreover, with the help of Balli Kombëtar bands, occupation forces outlined plans against villages and towns of Epirote sympathies, in order to demoralize them.

The British Mission proposed that MAVI and the Albanian communist party, LNC, should collaborate to form a stronger force against the Axis and Albanian collaborationists (Balli Kombëtar), and arranged several meetings near Gyrokaster in August–September 1943.

On August 8, representatives of the Northern Epirote resistance, decided to join the communist party only in specific attacks against the Axis, provided that the latter will recognize the autonomy of the region in the post-war period. Although the Albanian communist leaders agreed and assurances of the British allied mission were given, they secretly marked Vasilis Sahinis for liquidation.

German occupation
In September 1943 Italy surrendered to the Allies and its place in Albania was taken by German troops. Epirote groups were able to take the initiative for a short-time period.

During the period before Italy's surrender until the communist party prevailed (1943–1944) vicious fighting occurred between MAVI and combined armed groups of Germans and Albanian nationalists of Balli Kombëtar (Ballists) The results were devastating, many Ballist's bands looted and burned villages in their paths, shooting the inhabitants by firing squads, despite gender or age, burning the houses, some of which were locked with their occupants inside and hanging the village priests. In some occasions the operations were observed by German officers. In Moscopole the historic monastery of Saint John Baptist was destroyed as a result of these actions as well as in Bilisht and Leskovik the Balist bands of Safet Butka (an upper rank Ballist) resulted in heavy destruction and executions.

Vasilios Sachinis also protested to the Italian Occupation Forces, accusing them that they supported various activities of the Albanian resistance groups against the local Greek population. He became finally targeted by Albanian communists. Sachinis was assassinated on November 17, 1943, when the Albanian communist party raided Gjirokastër

In February 1944 the regions that were under the control of the Northern Epirote resistance were taken over by the Partisans of FNC. The last recorded action was during October 1944 when an Epirote band ambushed German troops and captured their officers. However, due to diplomatic failure of the British mission and unprovoked actions of the communist resistance (of Enver Hoxha), MAVI was doomed.

Aftermath
In Axis-supported Balli Kombëtar attacks and crimes against villages and towns, over 2,000 Greeks were killed, 5,000 imprisoned, and 2,000 taken hostages to concentration camps. Moreover, 15,000 homes, schools and church were destroyed.

Attacks in 80s and 90s
In 1984, when a car bomb killed the Albanian ambassador in Greece, and on 10 April 1994, when 2 Albanian officers were killed in a border post on the Greek-Albanian border,
responsibility was claimed by a far-right paramilitary organization which had the same name. Days later the Albanian authorities arrest six ethnic Greek militants on charges of promoting separatism and suspect ties with the Greek Intelligence services.

However, there is no clear link between the two organizations. According to press reports the World War II resistance organization,  probably disbanded during the 1940s. The group claims responsibility for a car bombing in the Albanian embassy in Attica, Greece, which left no victims.

References

Sources

Greek separatism
Northern Epirus
World War II resistance movements
Greek Resistance
Epirus in World War II
Paramilitary organizations based in Albania
Albanian Question